Maker(s) or The Maker(s) may refer to:

Film and television
The Maker (film), a 1997 American drama film
Makers: Women Who Make America, a 2013 American TV documentary, a 2014 TV series, and related media
Maker Studios, now part of Disney Digital Network, an American multi-channel TV network

Literature
Maker (Reed Richards), a Marvel Comics superhero turned supervillain
Makers (novel), a 2009 novel by Cory Doctorow
Makers: The New Industrial Revolution, a 2012 book by Chris Anderson
Maker Media, publisher of Make magazine and the 2006 book Makers

Music
The Makers (American band), a garage rock/rock-n-roll band formed in 1991
The Makers (Australian band), a rock group formed in 1988
Makers (album), by Rocky Votolato, or the title song, 2006
The Maker (Chris August album) or the title song, 2015
The Maker (Pat Martino album), 1994
"Maker", a song by the Hollies from Butterfly, 1967
"Maker", a song by Terror Jr from Unfortunately, Terror Jr, 2019
"The Maker", a song by Daniel Lanois from Acadie, 1989
"The Maker", a song by Martha Wainwright from Martha Wainwright, 2005

Other uses
Maker (surname), a list of people with the name
Maker, Cornwall, a village in England
Maker culture, a contemporary subculture
Super Mario Maker, a 2015 side-scrolling platform game
T/Maker, a personal computer software company

See also
Makar (disambiguation)
Make (disambiguation)